Mariusz Błażej (born 9 October 1968) is a Polish former footballer who played as a defender.

References

1968 births
Living people
Polish footballers
People from Rzeszów
Association football defenders
Zawisza Bydgoszcz players
Karpaty Krosno players
Stal Stalowa Wola players
Ekstraklasa players
I liga players